J. W. Rickaby (born James Emanuel Platt; 1870 – 1 October 1929) was an English music hall comedian.

Biography
He was born in Weymouth, Dorset, the son of a colour sergeant in the 7th Royal Lancashire Militia, and grew up in Manchester.  He married Martha Ann Waite in 1894.  He began as a serious actor and baritone singer, but discovered he could make a better living as a comic entertainer and first appeared as such in music halls in 1904.  He performed in a shabby frock coat, battered top hat, old boots and spats.

He toured Australia in 1908.  One review said of him: "He is a comedian with a good deal of genuine humor, which he exhibited in amusing burlesques of various types of character, such as a British soldier with a capacity for enjoyment, a sailor, and a policeman. These were hit off in such a manner as to keep the audience laughing heartily during his turns."  His songs included "What Ho, She Bumps!", "PC 49", and "Silk Hat Tony", which became better known as "They Built Piccadilly For Me". He recorded several of his songs.  He was offered the song "Burlington Bertie" but turned it down as being too similar to his other material.

He died in London in 1929, and was buried at Putney Vale Cemetery.

References

External links
 

1870 births
1929 deaths
Music hall performers
British male singers
British comedians